Amatula is a genus of moths in the subfamily Arctiinae. It contains only one species, Amatula kikiae, which is found in Yemen.

References

External links

Natural History Museum Lepidoptera generic names catalog

Moths described in 1983
Arctiinae
Moths of the Arabian Peninsula
Monotypic moth genera